The 2005 Oceania Club Championship Final was played on 10 June 2005 at Stade Pater in Papeete.

Route to the final

Note: In all results below, the score of the finalist is given first.

Match
The match was attended by approximately 4,000 spectators.

First half
Sydney FC started the stronger side, and went ahead within 20 minutes, when Matthew Bingley eventually shot home after a throw-in by Andrew Packer. Sasho Petrovski was dangerous for Sydney, as was Pierre Wajoka for AS Magenta. With 30 minutes gone, a chance fell for Petrovski, only to see his shot comfortably saved by Michel Hne.

Second half
Despite some dangerous attacking moves from AS Magenta early in the half, Sydney doubled their lead with an hour played when David Zdrilic headed home off a David Carney cross. The goal was enough to see Sydney hold out to win the Championship.

Details

Post match
Sydney FC's won their first Oceania Club Championship title, which saw them qualify for the 2005 FIFA Club World Championship.

References

OFC Champions League finals
Sydney FC matches